Nicky Guadagni (born August 1, 1953) is a Canadian actress who has worked on stage, radio, film and television.

Life and career
Originally from Montreal, Nicky Guadagni majored in drama at Dawson College and went on to train at the Royal Academy of Dramatic Art in London. Her first role after graduation was playing Miranda, with Paul Scofield as Prospero, in a production of The Tempest in the West End of London. Her theatre work in Canada includes A Midsummer Night's Dream at Stratford Third Stage; Zastrozzi and Criminal Genius at the Factory Theatre; Hamlet and Mother Courage for the National Arts Centre; The Seagull and The Member of the Wedding at Tarragon Theatre; and OD on Paradise at Theatre Passe Muraille.

Guadagni has been nominated for five Gemini Awards for her work on television, and received the award in 1998 (Best Supporting Actress, Major Crime) and 2004 (Best Actress in a Guest Role, Blue Murder, "Eyewitness"). She was a mainstay of the repertory cast of the A&E Network's A Nero Wolfe Mystery (2001–2002), playing no fewer than 13 highly varied roles in the course of the TV series and the pilot, The Golden Spiders: A Nero Wolfe Mystery (2000). She also played a leading role in cult sci-fi film Cube in 1997.

In 2002 Guadagni made her playwriting debut with In the Wings, adapted from the 1998 novel by Carole Corbeil, which she performed at Toronto's Theatre Passe Muraille. In 2011 an abbreviated version of her seven-character, one-person show Hooked, written by Carolyn Smart, was part of Toronto's Summerworks Theatre Festival schedule, with performances at Theatre Passe Muraille Backspace.

Guadagni taught voice and scene study for five years at George Brown College as well as at the University College Drama Program in Toronto, Ontario, and has also worked at the National Theatre School of Canada in Montreal. She has provided coaching and dramatic training for clients of the firm The Humphrey Group since 1995.

In 2019, she played the demented matriarch Helene Le Domas in the horror film Ready or Not.

Filmography

Awards
1985, Nominee, Gemini AwardTurning to StoneBest Performance by an Actress in a Lead RoleAcademy of Canadian Cinema and Television
1988, Nominee, Gemini AwardThe Squamish FiveBest Performance by an Actress in a Supporting RoleAcademy of Canadian Cinema and Television
1996, Nominee, Gemini AwardPerformance! Saying ItBest Performance by an Actress in a Lead Role in a Dramatic Program or MiniseriesAcademy of Canadian Cinema and Television
1998, Winner, Gemini AwardMajor CrimeBest Performance by an Actress in a Supporting RoleAcademy of Canadian Cinema and Television
2004, Winner, Gemini AwardBlue Murder (episode "Eyewitness")Best Performance by an Actress in a Guest Role in a Dramatic SeriesAcademy of Canadian Cinema and Television

References

External links

1952 births
Canadian film actresses
Canadian television actresses
Best Supporting Actress in a Television Film or Miniseries Canadian Screen Award winners
Living people
Anglophone Quebec people
Canadian people of Italian descent
Academic staff of the National Theatre School of Canada
Dawson College alumni
Alumni of RADA
Actresses from Montreal
Canadian stage actresses
Dora Mavor Moore Award winners
20th-century Canadian actresses
21st-century Canadian actresses